The 1984 Virginia Slims of Washington was a women's tennis tournament played on indoor carpet courts at the GWU Charles Smith Center in Washington in the United States that was part of the 1984 Virginia Slims World Championship Series. It was the 13th edition of the tournament and was held from January 2 through January 8, 1984. Sixth-seeded Hana Mandlíková won the singles title.

Finals

Singles
 Hana Mandlíková defeated  Zina Garrison 6–1, 6–1
 It was Mandlíková's 1st singles title of the year and the 17th of her career.

Doubles
 Barbara Potter /  Sharon Walsh defeated  Leslie Allen /  Anne White 6–1, 6–7, 6–2
 It was Potter's 1st title of the year and the 16th of her career. It was Walsh's 1st title of the year and the 25th of her career.

Prize money

References

External links
 International Tennis Federation (ITF) tournament edition details

Virginia Slims of Washington
Virginia Slims of Washington
Virginia Slims
1984 in American tennis